Hasan Özkan (born 14 November 1997) is a Belgium-born Turkish football player. He is under contract with Belgian club Oostende but has not played for the club since November 2018 and is not registered to play for them in the 2019–20 season. He also holds Belgian citizenship.

Club career
Özkan made his professional debut in the Belgian First Division A for Oostende on 4 February 2017 in a game against KV Mechelen.

International
Özkan is a youth international for Turkey at the U16, U17, U18, and U19 levels. He participated in the 2014 UEFA European Under-17 Championship for the Turkey national under-17 football team.

References

External links
 

1997 births
People from Jette
Turkish footballers
Turkey youth international footballers
Belgian footballers
Belgian people of Turkish descent
Living people
K.V. Oostende players
Belgian Pro League players
Association football midfielders
Footballers from Brussels